Stefan Đorđević (born 12 March 1989) is a Serbian professional basketball player for Esperos Lamias of the Greek A2 Basket League.

Professional career
In Poland, Đorđević played with Unia Tarnów in Poland. In Montenegro, he played with Ulcinj and Teodo Tivat. In Serbia, Djordjević played with Mega Aqua Monta and Smederevo 1953.

In 2013, Đorđević signed with the Greek club OFI Crete. With OFI Crete, Đorđević averaged 19.9 points and 7.1 rebounds per game. He finished second in points and seventh in rebounds, in the Greek 2nd Division's 2013–14 season.

In the 2014–15 season, Đorđević played with the Greek 2nd Division club Arkadikos. In the 2015–16 season, Đorđević played with the Greek 2nd Division club Doukas.

National team career
Đorđević was a member of the Serbia and Montenegro national under-16 team at the 2005 FIBA Europe Under-16 Championship.

References

External links 
 Profile at archive.fiba.com
 Profile at fibaeurope.com
 Profile at eurobasket.com
 Profile at competiciones.feb.es 

1989 births
Living people
Arkadikos B.C. players
ASK Karditsas B.C. players
Basketball League of Serbia players
Centers (basketball)
Charilaos Trikoupis B.C. players
Doukas B.C. players
KK Crvena zvezda youth players
KK Kotež Beko players
KK Mega Basket players
KK Smederevo players
OKK Spars players
KKK Radnički players
KK Teodo Tivat players
KK Zdravlje players
OFI Crete B.C. players
Oiakas Nafpliou B.C. players
Serbian expatriate basketball people in Bosnia and Herzegovina
Serbian expatriate basketball people in Greece
Serbian expatriate basketball people in Montenegro
Serbian expatriate basketball people in Poland
Serbian expatriate basketball people in Spain